Gopher Broke may refer to:
 Gopher Broke (1958 film), a Warner Bros. Looney Tunes cartoon short
 Gopher Broke (2004 film), a computer-animated short film